Upper Rawdon is a community in the Canadian province of Nova Scotia, located in the Municipal District of East Hants, which is in Hants County, Nova Scotia.  This community was originally part of the Rawdon Township.

Upper Rawdon was once famed for the "Rawdon Picnic", a church fund-raiser that happened on the July 1st Canada Day Holiday (though it was "Dominion Day" in those years). The picnics included baby parades, beauty contests, tug of war contests, carnival rides, church suppers and square dancing. The last Rawdon Picnic was held in 1975.

In popular culture
Folk singer Stan Rogers publicized the community by his song, "The Rawdon Hills" (See Video).

External links
Upper Rawdon, Destination Nova Scotia

Communities in Hants County, Nova Scotia
General Service Areas in Nova Scotia